The sculptural complex "Theseus saving Hippodamia" is located in Viktoria Square in Athens and is a sculptural creation of great artistic value. It is considered one of the most important outdoor sculpture works of the 20th century in Athens.

History
The sculpture was created in Berlin in 1906 by the German sculptor Johannes Pfuhl (1846–1914) and was cast in 1908 from galvanized bronze in a German factory. The entire sculptural structure stands on an octagonal marble base, with the engraved inscription "ΘΗΣΕΥΣ ΣΩΖΩΝ ΤΗΝ ΙΠΠΟΔΑΜΕΙΑΝ. ΕΡΓΟΝ Ι. ΠΦΟΥΛ" (Theseus saving Hippodamia. Work of J. Pfuhl). The sculpture depicts the hero Theseus who, according to Greek myth, saved the beautiful Hippodamia, the wife of King Pirithous of the Lapiths, from the drunken centaur Eurytion in the Centauromachy.

This bronze sculpture was donated to the Municipality of Athens in 1927 and was originally placed at Syntagma Square in Athens, from where it was moved in 1937 to its present location in Viktoria Square.

References 

Bronze sculptures in Greece
Nude sculptures
Outdoor sculptures